Colmurano is a comune (municipality) in the Province of Macerata in the Italian region of Marche, located about  southwest of Ancona and about  southwest of Macerata.

Colmurano borders the following municipalities: Loro Piceno, Ripe San Ginesio, San Ginesio, Tolentino, Urbisaglia.

References

Cities and towns in the Marche